Haverstock School (formerly Haverstock Comprehensive School), is a coeducational secondary school and sixth form located on Haverstock Hill in Haverstock, London, England. It is opposite Chalk Farm Underground station, and bounded by Prince of Wales Road and Crogsland Road.

History
The original school buildings were completed by 1874. The school later became a comprehensive after World War II.

The school is Camden's first private finance initiative (PFI) school and underwent a £21 million re-build in 2006.

Standards
An Ofsted inspection in 2008 resulted in a judgement of Good, and that of 2017 as requiring improvement.

In 2018, 66% of students achieved a grade 4 (equivalent to the old C) in Maths and English—an improvement from the previous year's 31% result.

Notable alumni

 John Barnes – England football international
 Tom Bentley – Politician and author
 Joe Cole – England football international
 Tulisa Contostavlos, Dino Contostavlos and Richard Rawson – N-Dubz group members
 John Duffy and David Mulcahy – rapists and serial-killers
 Julian Doyle – film-maker
Jermaine Eluemunor – American football player for the Las Vegas Raiders 
 Michael Gothard – actor
 Marlon Harewood – Footballer
 Nelufar Hedayat – presenter 
 Zoë Heller – journalist and Booker-prize shortlisted novelist.
 Oona King – Labour politician
 Steve McFadden – actor
 David Miliband – Former Labour Party politician, former Foreign Secretary
 Ed Miliband – Former Leader of the Labour Party
Charlie Sloth – DJ and radio presenter
 Ben Wheatley – Film Director
 Daniel Woodgate – Drummer for English Ska band Madness

References

External links
 
 "Ed Miliband's school, Haverstock, was hardly a model comprehensive"
 "Tony Parsons on Ed Miliband: I have seen his old comprehensive - and it shows why he is right to start a class war"

Secondary schools in the London Borough of Camden
Community schools in the London Borough of Camden